Sydney Roosters Women are a rugby league team, representing the Eastern Suburbs region of Sydney, New South Wales. The team is part of the Sydney Roosters club and plays in the National Rugby League Women's Premiership.

Current squad 
The Sydney Roosters have announced that the following players have signed to play with the club in the 2022 NRL Women's season. Jumper numbers in the table reflect the order that signatures were announced. 

The team is coached by John Strange.  

Table last updated on 5 October 2022.

Seasons

Club Records

Player Records 
Lists and tables last updated: 5 October 2022.

Most Games for the Roosters
 Zahara Temara  24, Isabelle Kelly  20, Sarah Togatuki  19, Jocelyn Kelleher  16, Hannah Southwell  13, Brydie Parker  13, Olivia Kernick  13.

Most Tries for the Roosters
 Isabelle Kelly  9, Olivia Kernick  6, Taleena Simon  5, Jayme Fressard 5.

Most Points for the Roosters (20+)

Most Points in a Season (16+)

Head-to-head records

Notes
 Share % is the percentage of points For over the sum of points For and Against.
 Clubs listed in the order than the Roosters Women first played them.

Margins and Streaks 
Biggest winning margins
 

Biggest losing margins

Most consecutive wins
 7  (3 April 2022  10 April 2022, 20 August 2022  18 September 2022)

Most consecutive losses
 4  (30 September 2018  29 September 2019)
 4  (17 October 2020  6 March 2022)

History 
On 27 March 2018, the Sydney Roosters applied for, and won, a license to participate in the inaugural 2018 NRL Women's season. Adam Hartigan was named as the coach of the women's side.

In June 2018, the club used up the maximum of fifteen marquee signings ahead of the inaugural season which subsequently commenced in September. Players signed included Karina Brown, Isabelle Kelly and Ruan Sims.

The club finished runners-up in the inaugural NRL Women's Premiership, losing to the Brisbane Broncos by 34–12 in the 2018 NRL Women's Premiership Grand Final. Zahara Temara claimed the 2018 Player of the Season award.

In 2019, Rick Stone took over as coach. The club, however, failed to win a match, claiming the wooden spoon. Tallisha Harden was awarded the club's Best & Fairest Player for the 2019 season.

Jamie Feeney was appointed the head coach for the 2020 season, being determined to turn the clubs fortunes around. He was assisted by Kylie Hilder and John Strange. Feeney immediately appointed Corban McGregor as the clubs new captain. The club also announced the big signing of Sevens Rugby star and 2016 Gold Medalist, Charlotte Caslick.

Players

References

External links
 
 Sydney Roosters Women at Rugby League Project

 
NRL Women's Premiership clubs
Rugby league teams in Sydney
Women's rugby league teams in Australia